The 1918 season was the seventh season for Santos Futebol Clube, a Brazilian football club, based in the Vila Belmiro bairro, Zona Intermediária, Santos, Brazil.

References

External links
Official Site 

Santos
1918
1918 in Brazilian football